Florent Serra was the defending champion. He reached the final, but lost to Evgeny Korolev 4–6, 3–6.

Seeds

Draw

Final four

Top half

Bottom half

References
 Main Draw
 Qualifying Draw

Pekao Open - Singles
2009 Singles
2009 in Polish tennis